Milan Chalupa (born July 4, 1953, in Oudoleň, Czechoslovakia) is a Czech former professional ice hockey defenceman who played 14 games for the Detroit Red Wings in the National Hockey League.

Chalupa began his career with HC Dukla Jihlava.  He was drafted 49th overall by the Detroit Red Wings in the 1984 NHL Entry Draft and played 14 games during the 1984-85 NHL season, contributing five assists.  He moved to Germany in 1985 with EHC Freiburg.

He completed for Czechoslovakia at the 1976 Winter Olympics and 1984 Winter Olympics, where the teams won the silver medal.

Career statistics

Regular season and playoffs

TCH totals do not include numbers from the 1973–74 to 1976–77 seasons.

International

References

External links 
 
 
 
 

1953 births
Living people
Czech ice hockey defencemen
Czechoslovak ice hockey defencemen
Olympic ice hockey players of Czechoslovakia
Olympic medalists in ice hockey
Olympic silver medalists for Czechoslovakia
Ice hockey players at the 1976 Winter Olympics
Ice hockey players at the 1980 Winter Olympics
Ice hockey players at the 1984 Winter Olympics
Medalists at the 1976 Winter Olympics
Medalists at the 1984 Winter Olympics
Adirondack Red Wings players
Detroit Red Wings draft picks
Detroit Red Wings players
EHC Freiburg players
HC Dukla Jihlava players
People from Havlíčkův Brod District
Sportspeople from the Vysočina Region
Czechoslovak expatriate sportspeople in the United States
Expatriate ice hockey players in the United States
Czechoslovak expatriate sportspeople in West Germany
Expatriate ice hockey players in West Germany
Czechoslovak expatriate ice hockey people
Czechoslovak expatriate sportspeople in Germany
Czech expatriate ice hockey players in Germany
Czech ice hockey coaches